Walter Herschel Beech (January 30, 1891 – November 29, 1950) was an American aviator and early aviation entrepreneur who co-founded the Beech Aircraft Company (now called Beechcraft) in 1932 with his wife, Olive Ann Beech, and a team of three others.

Biography
He was born in Pulaski, Tennessee on January 30, 1891. Beech started flying in 1905, at age 14, when he built a glider of his own design. Then, after flying for the United States Army during World War I, he joined the Swallow Airplane Company as a test pilot. He later became general manager of the company. In 1924, he, Lloyd Stearman, and Clyde Cessna formed Travel Air Manufacturing Company. When the company merged with Curtiss-Wright, Beech became vice-president.

In 1932, he and his wife, Olive Ann Beech, along with Ted Wells, K.K. Shaul, and investor C.G. Yankey, co-founded the Beech Aircraft Company in Wichita, Kansas. Their early Beechcraft planes won the Bendix Trophy. During World War II, Beech Aircraft produced more than 7,400 military aircraft. The twin Beech AT-7/C-45 trained more than 90 percent of the U.S. Army Air Forces navigator/bombardiers. The company went on to become one of the "big three" in American general aviation aircraft manufacturing during the 20th century (along with Cessna and Piper).

Beech died from a heart attack on November 29, 1950. He and his wife are buried at Old Mission Mausoleum in Wichita.

In 1977, Beech was posthumously inducted into the National Aviation Hall of Fame. at the National Museum of the United States Air Force, and 1982, he was inducted into the International Air & Space Hall of Fame at the San Diego Air & Space Museum.

References

External links
Biography at Hill Air Force Base website 
Archive - Walter H. and Olive Ann Beech Collection at Wichita State University

1891 births
1950 deaths
American aviation businesspeople
American test pilots
Beechcraft
Curtiss-Wright Company
People from Pulaski, Tennessee
United States Army Air Forces pilots
United States Army personnel of World War I
Ford National Reliability Air Tour
Aviation pioneers
People from Wichita, Kansas
National Aviation Hall of Fame inductees
American company founders
Businesspeople from Kansas
20th-century American businesspeople